L'Hebdo was a weekly French-language news magazine published in Lausanne, Switzerland. It existed between 1981 and 2017.

History and profile
L'Hebdo was established in 1981. The magazine, based in Lausanne, is part of Ringier and is published by Ringier weekly on Wednesdays. Its editor in chief is Alain Jeannet. The magazine, published in French, covers articles about social, economic and cultural issues.

In 1997 L'Hebdo had a circulation of 56,950 copies. 
Between July 2004 and June 2005 its circulation was 43,911 copies. It was 44,870 between July 2005 and June 2006 and 48,451 copies between July 2006 and June 2007. Its circulation became 44,979 copies between July 2007 and June 2008. The circulation of the weekly was 45,000 copies in 2008 and 46,000 copies in 2009. The magazine had a circulation of 38,040 copies and a readership of 181,000 in 2014.

L' Hebdo ceased publication on 2 February 2017, at a readership of 155,000, because it had become unprofitable.

See also
 List of magazines in Switzerland

References

External links
 Official website

1981 establishments in Switzerland
2017 disestablishments in Switzerland
Defunct magazines published in Switzerland
French-language magazines
Magazines established in 1981
Magazines disestablished in 2017
Mass media in Lausanne
News magazines published in Europe
Weekly magazines published in Switzerland